Mount Calavite is a peak located in the island of Mindoro in the Philippines. It measures  in elevation and is situated in its namesake headland, Cape Calavite, which forms the northwestern extremity of Mindoro.
The mountain overlooks the municipality of Paluan in the south and the Lubang Island group in the Verde Island Passage in the north.   It is one of only three areas in the island where Mindoro dwarf buffalos, commonly known as tamaraws, are found.

Protected area
Mount Calavite is located in an  protected area known as Mount Calavite Wildlife Sanctuary. It was first declared as a game refuge and bird sanctuary in 1920 to protect the natural habitat of the endemic Mindoro tamaraw. In 1925, the mountain and its adjacent area of FB Harrison village, Paluan was proclaimed a national park. The park's current designation as a wildlife sanctuary dates to 2000.

Other wildlife known to inhabit the park include endemic bird species such as the Mindoro bleeding-heart, Mindoro hornbill, spotted imperial pigeon and scarlet-collared flowerpecker.

See also
List of protected areas of the Philippines

References

Mountains of the Philippines
Landforms of Occidental Mindoro
Wildlife sanctuaries of the Philippines